This is a list of the National Register of Historic Places listings in Goliad County, Texas.

This is intended to be a complete list of properties and districts listed on the National Register of Historic Places in Goliad County, Texas. There are one National Historic Landmark, five districts, and seven other individually listed properties on the National Register in the county. Among these, either among individual properties or contained within districts, are two State Historic Sites, four State Antiquities Landmarks, and numerous Recorded Texas Historic Landmarks.

Current listings

The publicly disclosed locations of National Register properties and districts may be seen in a mapping service provided.

|}

See also

National Register of Historic Places listings in Texas
Recorded Texas Historic Landmarks in Goliad County

References

External links

Registered Historic Places
Goliad County